The Subei Mongol Autonomous County is an autonomous county within the prefecture-level city of Jiuquan in the northwest of Gansu Province, China, bordering Xinjiang to the west, Qinghai Province to the southeast and Mongolia's Govi-Altai Province to the north. To the east it shares a border with Ejin Banner, Alxa League, Inner Mongolia.

History
In the early 1930s, Birger Bohlin studied the paleontology of the region (then called Taban Buluk).

In 1937, Subei Shezhiju was established.

On July 22, 1950, PLA forces entered the Subei area. The Subei Autonomous District, predecessor of the Subei Mongol Autonomous County, was established on July 29, 1950. The area became Subei Mongol Autonomous District in 1953. In 1955, the area became Subei Mongol Autonomous County.

In September 1992, with the approval of the State Council of the People's Republic of China, the only international border crossing in Gansu Province was opened in the Mazongshan area of Subei Mongol Autonomous County.

Horse shows and races are held periodically in the county.

Climate
A large part of Subei is in the Gobi Desert. The county has been subject to large dust storms with noted incidents in May 2011 and June 2016. There are glaciers in some parts of the county.

Administrative divisions
Subei's administrative seat ("capital") is the town of Dangchengwan. The county includes two townships, Shibaocheng and Yanchiwan and one other town to the north separated from the rest of the county, Mazongshan named for Mazong Mountain.

2 Towns
 Dangchengwan
 Mazongshan

2 Townships
 Shibaocheng 
 Yanchiwan

Former administrative divisions in the county include the townships Biegai, Dangcheng, Yu'erhong and Mingshui.

Demographics

Subei is home to Deed Mongols (Upper Mongols) who migrated to the area. In 1996, the Mongol ethnicity population was 37.5% of the county's total population.

Gallery

References

External links

 《中华民族》 大美肃北 第一集 净土：随善良质朴肃北人民 赏净土山水草原大美风光 20190819 | CCTV ('The Chinese People- Majestic Subei Part One: Pure Land: Enjoying the Mountains, Waters, Grasslands and Beautiful Scenery of the Pure Land with the Warm-hearted and Plain Folk of Subei Aug 19 2019 CCTV') 

Mongol autonomous counties
County-level divisions of Gansu
Jiuquan